Felicity McCall is an Irish journalist, writer and broadcaster who began her career with two decades working for the BBC in Northern Ireland. She has over twenty published works include novels, non-fiction, plays, and anthologies.

Life 
McCall worked for the BBC for twenty years and in around 2000 she settled down to being a full-time writer.

In 2006 she published a biography of Agnes Jones who was one of the nurses working with Florence Nightingale in the Crimea.

Her plays have been professionally produced in the UK, Ireland, the USA, and Australasia; her awards include the UK National Lottery Award for Heritage 2011 for We Were Brothers; two Epic Ireland awards in 2013 for Every Bottle has a Story to Tell; two Meyer Whitworth nominations, for No Goodbyes (2008) and We Were Brothers (2010); and the Tyrone Guthrie Scriptwriting Award (2006–07). Much of her work is based on historical fact or social activism. Her screenplay credits include Agnes (Ambient Light/GSCA 2006), based on the life of the Irish nursing pioneer Agnes Jones, and Jam (Brassneck Productions).

McCall is also a director and founding member of theatre groups Handful Productions and Postscript, and co-founded the Derry Writers' Group. She serves on the Irish Executive of the National Union of Journalists.

References

 Guildhall Press website

External links

Year of birth missing (living people)
Living people
Irish dramatists and playwrights
Irish screenwriters
Irish theatre directors
Irish women journalists
Irish women dramatists and playwrights
Irish women screenwriters